Adnen Helali (born in Sbeitla, 23 March 1975) is a Tunisian poet and actor, born in 1975 in Sbeitla, Tunisia. He is a teacher of French language in Sbeitla, and a member of the theatre group Founoun located in his city.

Adnen is the founder and director of the Sbeitla's Spring International Festival, since 2000. and Rosemary festival of Wassaia, a small village witch belongs to Sbeitla.

Filmography
In 2007, Adnen appeared as Garrett Flaherty in Left for Dead; an American horror western film starring Victoria Maurette and directed by Albert Pyun.

Work
 Fartatou
 Zalabani

References

External links

1975 births
Living people
20th-century Tunisian poets
Tunisian male stage actors
21st-century Tunisian male actors
21st-century Tunisian poets